Juan Humberto Valdivieso Padilla (6 May 1910 – 2 May 2007) was a Peruvian football goalkeeper and manager.

Playing career
During his career, he played club football for Alianza Lima. He made 10 appearances for the Peru national football team, participating at the 1930 FIFA World Cup and 1936 Summer Olympics.

Managerial career
After retiring as a player, Valdivieso went on to manage a number of clubs in Peru and the Peru national team.

Personal life
His youngest son, Luis Valdivieso Montano, is the current Minister of the Economy and Finance of Peru. His grandson, Juan Pablo Valdivieso, represented Peru in swimming during the 2000 and 2004 Summer Olympics.

He died in 2007 at 96 years old.

References

External links 

1910 births
2007 deaths
Footballers from Lima
Peruvian footballers
Association football goalkeepers
1930 FIFA World Cup players
Footballers at the 1936 Summer Olympics
Olympic footballers of Peru
Peru international footballers
Peruvian Primera División players
Club Alianza Lima footballers
Peruvian football managers
Peru national football team managers
Deportivo Municipal managers
Sport Boys managers
Copa América-winning players